Belenda is a village in Bhatar CD block in Bardhaman Sadar North subdivision of Purba Bardhaman district in the state of West Bengal, India with total 863 families.

History
Census 2011 Belenda Village Location Code or Village Code 319817. The village of Belenda is located in the Bhatar tehsil of Burdwan district in West Bengal, India.

Transport 

Population 
Schedule Caste (SC) constitutes 19.80% while Schedule Tribe (ST) were 3.78% of total population in Belenda village.

Population and house data

Healthcare
Nearest Rural Hospital at Bhatar (with 60 beds) is the main medical facility in Bhatar CD block. There are primary health centres.

School
BELENDA BALSIDANGA F.P. SCHOOL.

References 

Villages in Purba Bardhaman district